Iván Fandiño Barros (September 29, 1980 – June 17, 2017) was a Spanish bullfighter.

Fandiño died of injuries he sustained after being gored by a bull on June 17, 2017, in Aire-sur-l'Adour, France. Fandiño stumbled after he tripped on a cape used to engage and distract the bull. The bull then pierced his torso from behind with its horns, ripping a hole into his lung and his stomach as well as his vena cava, which fatally wounded him.

See also
List of bullfighters

References

1980 births
2017 deaths
Bullfighters killed in the arena
Filmed deaths in sports
People from Arratia-Nerbioi
Spanish bullfighters
Sport deaths in France
Sportspeople from Biscay